Mark Blair (born 27 November 1974 in Matlock, Derbyshire) is a British auto racing driver. He started his racing career in karting in 1986, and represented England in the 1990 World Kart Championships. In 1992 he switched to rallying, driving in the Peugeot Challenge, where he finished fourth in points. In 1993, he went on to be the Peugeot Challenge champion, including eight class wins. He moved into saloon car racing in 1997 with the Vauxhall Vectra Challenge, becoming champion in 1998.

After his success in the Vectra, he got a drive in the British Touring Car Championship. He raced as an independent for ADR Motorsport, again in a Vectra. His first season in the BTCC was a successful one, finishing second in the independents Cup with two independent wins, and sixteenth in points overall. In 2001, he raced in four rounds at Oulton Park and Silverstone for JS Motorsport in an Alfa Romeo 147. Amongst a small field of drivers, he still finished joined eleventh in the championship with fifteen points.

Racing record

Complete British Touring Car Championship results
(key) (Races in bold indicate pole position - 1 point awarded all races) (Races in italics indicate fastest lap) (* signifies that driver lead feature race for at least one lap - 1 point awarded)

References

External links
 BTCC.net official standings.
 BTCC Pages Profile.

Living people
British Touring Car Championship drivers
English racing drivers
1974 births